AAARTH is the fourth studio album by Welsh rock band The Joy Formidable. It was released on 28 September 2018. The title references the Welsh word 'arth', which means 'bear'.

Track listing

Charts

References

External links
 Official website

2018 albums
The Joy Formidable albums